Mammea suriga is a species of flowering plant in the family Calophyllaceae. It is a medium-sized plant bearing fragrant white flowers. It is cultivated in Western Ghats for its flowers. Its leaves are simple and opposite. It is called Surige Mara in Kannada, Surnga in Kokani, Goa.

It is a coastal tree native to south India. A medium tall evergreen tree, the suriga bears small fleshy fruits. The outside of the fruit is green turns yellowish at ripening, surface smooth textured and inedible, covering sweet flesh juicy substance.
Flowering starts from mid-February continues until mid-March. The nature of pollination is honey bee because of fragrance honey bee will attract. After pollination, it takes 15 days to fruit set. After pollination, it takes 40-45 days for fruits to ripen

The small yellow flowers emit a sweet smell and are turned into gajra, hair flower garlands, in Goa. The trees grow in the wild. Traditionally people collect the flowers from the forest trees to turn them into beautiful garlands. The flower garlands are not commercially sold.

References

suriga